Tempita Vihara is a unique type of image house found in some Buddhist temples in Sri Lanka. With an inimitable architecture design, Tempita Viharas were a popular aspect of many Buddhist temples during the 17th to 19th centuries. Construction of Tempita Viharas in or after the 20th century has been not recorded. More than two hundred Tempita Viharas have been identified in Sri Lanka to date. Most of the shrines are found in North Western, Sabaragamuwa, Central and Western provinces.

Medawala Tempita Vihara in Kandy is considered the first accounted Tempita Vihara in Sri Lanka. According to the Medawala copper plaque, it was a two-storied shrine during the 14th century and was renovated as a Tempita Vihara by Kirti Sri Rajasinha (1747–1781) in 1755. Minuwangamuwa Tempita Vihara in Kegalle is believed to be the last Tempita Vihara in the island built on 2 May 1886.

Beside the Buddhist temples, few Ambalamas and Devalayas have been identified in Sri Lanka as Tempita buildings. These structures are also built on raised stone pillars or rock boulders but have minor differences in its architecture design. Awariyawala Ambalama in Gampaha, Panawitiya Ambalama in Kurunegala and Halpe Pattini Devalaya in Ella are three examples of them.

The structure
Perched on raised stone pillars or stumps, Tempita Viharas possess wooden platforms and wattle walls supporting a timber framed roof. Usually pillars are in exposed state and not more than three or four feet in height. However the pillars used in some temples such as Dodamthale Raja Maha Vihara in Mawanella and Ambulugala Raja Maha Vihara are about six feet in height. Wattle walls make the main enclosed shrine room containing the Buddha statues made of Limestones or timber. Inner walls are usually decorated with varies murals and paintings of the Kandyan period. The roofs are two-pitched and covered with flat clay tiles. Some Tempita Viharas have narrow verandas circulating the main enclosed space.

Secondary feature constructions 

Initially being built as an image house, the  seems to have taken some time to depart from its main utilities.

Doragamuwa and Diyasunnata are two such examples.

Moreover, a large proportioned meditation hall has been constructed and joined with the roof of the 's sermon hall by means of a storm gutter, thus creating a new structure.

The tam or base pillars which are the identity of a  being covered up during later renovations was a not-so-rare and rare experience during the research. When thus covered, in appearance it becomes a temple built on a normal foundation. The  at Asmadala, Bodhimalkada and Udatalavinna, thus renovated in recent history are examples that could be proved.

Kirielle and Kadigamuwa 
They are Kadigamuwa and Kirielle. At Kadigamuwa two  have been constructed vertically during the past 100 years or so, at the Nadun Viharaya in Kirielle two have been constructed horizontally abutting each other. At the twin  in Kirielle, the base pillars have been covered up during later renovations, while their structural appearances and paintings exhibit a Sabaragamuwa identity in a mixed feature of the Kandyan Era and the Southern traditions, thus forming a valuable creation of art. While the nearby new temple constructed horizontally exhibits the features of the cultural progress of the times; for a person studying the arts or socio-monastic progress, the first  could be considered a special milestone in the study of the art of temple complexes from their inception to the present.

Kadigamuwa too exhibits the heritage of a similar series of constructions as two vertical  and a new temple while they have been constructed in a row behind the ancient Bo tree. At Kirielle, all the openings face the Bo tree.

Various constructions have been carried out within Kadigamuwa with the direct and indirect sponsorships of King Valagamba to King Keerthi Sri Rajasinghe. Since it has been constructed alongside the road to the kingdom via Balana, it has undergone various transformations due to many a socio-cultural factors. The entire temple complex stands proudly while featuring the core of all Sri Lankan arts.

While history bears witness that this was gifted to Venerable Karandana Devarakkita Unnanse for the temple to be built, it is said that this  is 8,305 acres in extent. While it is no secret that the  became a treasury of wealth due to the presence of graphite and rubber, the significance of this  could be realized from the study of these troika of temples under the Nadun Viharaya.

These contemporarily built temples are similar while being constructed as the first , the second  and the new temple. These two temples constructed alongside the ancient road to the kingdom from the South of Sri Lanka geographically belong to Sabaragamuwa and the central Provinces. Hence, for over a century this troika of temples has carried the artistic features unique to each region and these have been properly established within structurally similar .

The identities of each particular era are clearly evident within these structures created through a fine mixture of factors like economic strength, sponsorship and guidance. While the same  undergoing timely modifications is a common experience, this image house which is outside of this added living data towards a new direction for this research.

Soldara Vihara (Storied Temples) 
This could be called a unique set encountered during the research into . While the literal term soldara vihara ('storied temples') is practiced within the glossary of Mawanella and Kegalle in identify these, I introduce this to the research through the same. 

 are seven in number. They are the Mahalloluwa, Attanagoda, Dodantale, Gallengolla, Keraminiya, Keselwatta and Ketapitiya.

Among these, except Ketapitiya, all the others are located on the right side of the Kandy Road (while travelling from Colombo to Kandy) and in close proximity to the old Kandy Road connecting Sabaragamuwa. Poththapitiya, with its unique architectural creations amidst the Ketapitiya Raja Maha Viharaya (ancient temple) and several other temples is located at the Ketapitiya junction along the Kadugannawa road. The  constructed within a special geographic region with special architectural features is a wonderful architectural creation.

These temples rising upward with the wooden floor on high arches as the ground are magnificent in appearance; spacious and are rectangular in shape. While the upper floor with the Buddha image is also spacious, it has a four-faceted roof of the Kandyan Era or a twin-skewed four faceted roof.

While storied houses of nobles within the social systems of the times are found island-wide, they are a common component as architectural creations. The name  (storied temples) may have come into public practice since these temples had been built with their ground and upper floors occupying large spaces similar to that for a house. Dodantale is the most ancient among the  while Mahalloluwa and Gallengolla could be considered the most recently built.

Kadawaragedara Sulugulu Thambita viharaya 

The  at the Sulugulu Rajamaha Viharaya has been built during the Kandyan revival of this temple.  A  is a structure built on a wooden platform which rests on number of stone stumps usually three to four feet high. The roof is held by a structure built of timber and the walls are generally made of wattle and daub. Walls inside the image chamber are more or less always covered in murals drawn mainly in Kandyan style.

The  at the Sulugulu Rajamaha Viharaya is built on fairly high granite pillars about five feet high. A circumambulating path is built around the image house protected by a half-height wall. The path is narrow except at the front. Wooden pillars around the path hold the roof tiled with flat clay tiles typical of roofs built during the Kandyan kingdom. The roof has been extended at the front at the same angle to create a mandapa. A wooden stairway leads to the platform where the image house is built. Both inner and the outer walls of the image house are covered with murals. This  has been restored by the Department of Archaeology in 2014.

Temples

References

 ‘බෞද්ධ විහාරාංග සම්ප්‍රදායේ උඩරට කලාගාරය’ ‘ශ්‍රී ලංකාවේ ටැම්පිට විහාර’ Samkathana Research Center & Archive, University of Kelaniya
 අපේ උරුමකම 01 කොටස (2016.01.19)
 අපේ උරුමකම - 02 කොටස (2016.01.19)
 අපේ උරුමකම - 03 කොටස (2016.01.19)
 Artistic traditions in 'Temples on Pillars' (Tämpita Vihāras) of Sri Lanka Evolving Traditions of the Buddhist Image House (විහාරගෙය) Understanding two centuries of art and architecture in Sri Lanka- Part I Ganga Rajinee Dissanayaka

External links

 
 
 
 
 
 
 
 

Architecture in Sri Lanka
Archaeology of Sri Lanka